Rascoe is a surname. Notable people with the surname include:

Bobby Rascoe (born 1940), American basketball player
Burton Rascoe (1892–1957), American journalist, editor and literary critic
Judith Rascoe (born 1941), American screenwriter

See also 
Roscoe (name)